The gull-billed tern (Gelochelidon nilotica), formerly Sterna nilotica, is a tern in the family Laridae. It is widely distributed and breeds in scattered localities in Europe, Asia, northwest Africa, and the Americas. The Australian gull-billed tern was previously considered a subspecies.

Taxonomy
The gull-billed tern was formally described in 1789 by the German naturalist Johann Friedrich Gmelin in his revised and expanded edition of Carl Linnaeus's Systema Naturae. He placed it with terns in the genus Sterna and coined the binomial name Sterna nilotica. Gmelin based his description on the "Egyptian tern" that had been described in 1785 by the English ornithologist John Latham in his book A General Synopsis of Birds. Latham had in turn based his own account on that by the Swedish naturalist Fredrik Hasselquist that was published in 1757. The gull-billed tern was moved to the resurrected genus Gelochelidon based on a molecular phylogenetic study published in 2005. The genus had been introduced in 1830 by the German zoologist Alfred Brehm. The genus name combines the Ancient Greek gelaō meaning "to laugh" with khelidōn meaning "swallow". The specific epithet nilotica is from Latin niloticus meaning "of the River Nile".

Five subspecies are recognised:
 G. n. nilotica (Gmelin, 1789) – nominate, found in Europe, North Africa through the Middle East & south-central Asia to western China & Thailand  
 G. n. affinis (Horsfield, 1821) – found in Transbaikalia to Manchuria, Japan, south and east China through southeast Asia to the Philippines, Borneo, Sulawesi & Sumatra
 G. n. aranea (Wilson, 1814) – found in eastern & southern United States, Greater Antilles
 G. n. vanrossemi Bancroft, 1929 – found from southern California to northwestern Mexico
 G. n. gronvoldi Mathews, 1912 – found from French Guiana to northeastern Argentina

Description

This is a fairly large and powerful tern, similar in size and general appearance to a Sandwich tern, but the short thick gull-like bill, broad wings, long legs and robust body are distinctive. The summer adult has grey upperparts, white underparts, a black cap, strong black bill and black legs. The call is a characteristic ker-wik.

In winter, the cap is lost, and there is a dark patch through the eye like a Forster's tern or a Mediterranean gull. Juvenile gull-billed terns have a fainter mask, but otherwise look much like winter adults.

Juvenile Sandwich terns have a short bill, and are frequently mistaken for gull-billed tern where the latter species is uncommon, such as North Sea coasts.

Distribution and habitat
It breeds in warmer parts of the world in southern Europe, temperate and eastern Asia, both coasts of North America, eastern South America. This bird has a number of geographical races, differing mainly in size and minor plumage details.

All forms show a post-breeding dispersal, but the northern breeders are most migratory, wintering south to Africa, the Caribbean and northern South America, southern Asia and New Zealand.

The gull-billed tern is one of the species to which the Agreement on the Conservation of African-Eurasian Migratory Waterbirds (AEWA) applies.

Behaviour and ecology

Breeding
The gull-billed tern breeds in colonies on lakes, marshes and coasts (including bays and earthen levees). It nests in a ground scrape and lays two to five eggs. While widely distributed in freshwater areas in Eurasia, it is associated almost solely with saltwater, coastal areas in North America.

Food and feeding
This is a somewhat atypical tern, in appearance like a Sterna tern, but with feeding habits more like the Chlidonias marsh terns, black tern and white-winged tern. It does not normally plunge dive for fish like the other white terns, and has a broader diet than most other terns. It largely feeds on insects taken in flight, and also often hunts over wet fields and even in brushy areas, to take amphibians and small mammals. It is also an opportunistic feeder, and has been observed to pick up and feed on dead dragonflies from the road.

Gallery

References

External links

 
 
 
 
 
 
 
 

gull-billed tern
Birds of the Americas
Birds of the Dominican Republic
Birds of Eurasia
Birds described in 1789
Taxa named by Johann Friedrich Gmelin
Articles containing video clips
Cosmopolitan birds
Holarctic birds